Juja is a town in Kiambu County in Kenya. It is the home town for Jomo Kenyatta University of Agriculture and Technology (JKUAT). It is also a constituency in Kiambu county, currently represented in parliament by Hon. George Koimburi following the demise of the late Hon. Francis Munyua Waititu. The MCA (Member of County Assembly)
is Kalpesh Jayantilal Shah, who represents the people of Juja Ward at the County Government.

Juja is home to more than 200,000 Kenyans, who are mostly students.

There are several industries in Juja, including the home to Juja Pulp and Paper, which recycles brown paper.
Star Plastics is another manufacturer which makes water drums and other plastic products.
Safari Stationers manufactures stationery products.
Hydro Aluminum makers of aluminum profiles.

Juja is also home to The Juja City Mall, Juja Preparatory School, Kalimoni Primary School, Mang'u High School and parts of Thika superhighway.

The town is located about 30 kilometers North of Nairobi between Thika and Ruiru towns. The Nairobi Business Park is found in the environs of this town. One should keep in mind that Juja is under the Nairobi Metropolitan Authority as envisaged in the Vision 2030 of Kenya.

It has a population of 156,041, according to the 2019 census.

History of Juja Town
Private records from McMillan Memorial Library indicate that sometime in 1900, when Lord William Northrop Macmillan arrived in Nairobi, he was carrying two statues he had bought in West Africa. He had been told that one was Ju and the other was Ja, and had been asked to preserve them – otherwise he would perish at sea.

McMillan then settled on the road to Thika where he bought some 19,000 acres, at a time when nobody was allowed to own more than 5,000 acres. Privately, he attributed it to the powers of Ju and Ja idols and as a result he named the large expanse Ju-Ja Farm.

Because of the numerous superstition that surrounded Juja Farm, it became a no-go zone and locals used to fear entry into a land they always heard had been jinxed. As a result, McMillan's wife took the two idols from the house and buried them in Ndarugu valley, near Thika Town. As a result, the name Juja started entering into annals of colonial history in Kenya and refused to give way to its former name ‘Weru wa Ndarugu’, the Ndarugu plains. (Courtesy: The Business Daily Newspaper)
Currently Juja Constituency is having 5 Wards namely Juja, Murera, Theta, Kalimoni and Witithie.
Juja Ward has the highest population out of the 5 wards. Juja Ward has a lot of centers namely 1)Muchatha 2)Kanini Farm 3) Shalom 4)HardRock 5)Boma estate 6)Kay's 7) Murehma 8) Croton E 9) Riverside Kibii 10) Kipipiri 11) Mathare 12) Eastleigh 13) Mlandizi 14) Josephine's 15) Riverside Juja 16) Carnation 17) Orion 18) Greenfield 19) Joyland 20) United 21) Makena 22) Bomblast 23) Danemas 24) White house 25) Oasis 26)Kifariti 27) St Mary's 28) Woodland 29) Waroma 30)Mirimaini 31) Number4 32) George's 33) Munghetto 34) Ol Kaluo 35) Molo 36) Kisumu Ndogo 37) Westview 38) Kanawa 39) Chemi Chemi 40)Mashanani 41) Baba Martins 42) Gachororo Farmers 43) Kiaora 44) Nesco 45) Azania 46) St Paul's 47) Dam View 48)Titanic 49) Tumaini 50) Berea 51) Soko Gachororo 52) Gachororo 53)White line 54) Highpoint 55)County offices 56)Sunrise 57) Kareme 58) Cheers 59)Seagull 60) Marbles 61) Philo1 62)Mwangaza 63)

Education
Public Primary Schools
Thiririka Primary School
Gachororo Primary School
Kalimoni Primary School
Mirimani Primary School
Juja Farm Primary School
Karamaini Primary School 
Nyachaba Primary School 
Athi Primary School
Jkuat Primary School
Kiaora Primary School 
Kibii Primary School 
St Paul Primary School 
Kigwe Primary School 
St. Francis Primary School 
Mwireri Primary School 
Karakuta Primary School 
Kuraiha Primary School 
Ndururumo Primary School 
Thome Primary School 
Kumura Primary School 
Theta Primary School 
Rurii Primary School 
Munyaka Primary School 
Public High Schools
Mangu High School
Gachororo Secondary School
Kalimoni Senior School

Technical Colleges
Kilimambogo Technical Training College

Public Universities
Jomo Kenyatta University of Agriculture and Technology

More Functions of Juja Town
Juja also serves as the Main Headquarters to a couple of organisations such as Straight Security, a private security company that provides manned security all over Kenya, Senate Hotel, a 3 star Hotel, Glowbal Digital; A digital marketing company owned by The Medici Group, The Ksh. 1.7 Billion Juja City Mall and Ruiru Juja Water and Sewerage Company (RUJWASCO), a service company that provides piped water and sewerage services to Ruiru, Juja and its environs within Kiambu County.
Juja is also home to tech startup Onetap Technologies  mostly known for their School Software, SchoolCloud recently rebranded to SchoolCloudAfrica

References

Populated places in Kenya